Xi River virus (XRV) is a putative novel bat virus in the genus Orthoreovirus isolated from fruit bats in Guangdong Province in southern China. It is the first bat reovirus isolated in China.

Virology

Genome
Only a partial sequence of XRV was isolated from the fruit bat, but based on its open reading frame it was identified as a reovirus. XRV has the same morphology and high sequence identity as Nelson Bay virus (NBV), and a 10-segmented double-stranded RNA genome, as well as high sequence identity to NBV members.

Reoviruses are non-enveloped, double-stranded RNA viruses. They have an icosahedral capsid (T-13) composed of an outer and inner protein shell. The genome contains 10–12 segments grouped into three categories by size: L (large), M (medium) and S (small). Segments range from ~ 3.9 kbp – 1kbp and each segment encodes 1–3 proteins. Reoviridae proteins are denoted by the Greek character corresponding to the segment it was translated from (the L segment encodes for λ proteins, the M segment encodes for μ proteins and the S segment encodes for σ proteins).

See also
 Bat-borne virus
 Double-stranded RNA viruses
 Nelson Bay virus
 Oncolytic virus
 Orphan virus

References

External links 
 
 NCBI ORF finder – A web based interactive tool for predicting and analysing ORFs from nucleotide sequences.

Orthoreoviruses
Bat virome
Unaccepted virus taxa